The Ministry of Defense is the ministry of the Government of National Unity of Libya responsible for the Libyan Armed Forces and manages the country's internal security and defense affairs.

History

Gaddafi era 
In 1991, the Defence Ministry ceased to exist in 1991, with Abu-Bakr Yunis Jabr continuing as Secretary of the Libyan General Committee for Defence and Commander-in-Chief of the Libyan Army.

Modern ministry

Agencies and entities 

 Military Judicial Authority
 Military Industry Authority
 Military Medical Authority
 Applied Studies and Development Authority
 Military Inspection Authority
 Services and Maintenance Center
 LMAC

Think Tanks 

 "Al-Salam" Center for Strategic Studies

 “Libya” Center for Strategic Studies
 Libyan Center for Advanced Industries

Administrations And Offices 

 Minister’s Office
 Legal Affairs Office
 Intel Office
 Internal Auditing Office
 International Cooperation Office
 Human Rights Office
 Media Office
 Monitoring Office
 Delegates Offices
 Administration of Strategic Planning
 Administration of Military Intel
 Administration of Military Affairs
 Administration of Administrative Affairs
 Administration of Human Resource
 Administration of Military Protocol
 Administration of Military Medical Services
 Administration of Financial Affairs
 Administration of Military Accounts
 Administration of Military Procurement
 Administration of Production

List of ministers

See also 

 Cabinet of Libya

References 

Defence ministries
Military of Libya
Government of Libya